Kafr El-Zayat Secondary School For Boys is one of the biggest high schools in the markaz of Kafr El-Zayat, in Gharbia Governorate, Egypt.

Schools in Egypt

References